John Godard may refer to:

John Godard (died 1392), MP for Yorkshire
John Godard (fl. 1377–1402), MP for Sandwich

See also
John Goddard (disambiguation)